John Burgoyne (1722–1792) was a British army officer in the Saratoga campaign, politician and dramatist.

John Burgoyne may also refer to:

 John Burgoyne (MP for Cambridgeshire) (died c. 1435), MP for Cambridgeshire
 Sir John Fox Burgoyne (1782–1871), senior British Army officer
 Sir John Burgoyne, 1st Baronet (c. 1592–1657), High Sheriff of Bedfordshire, Member of Parliament for Warwickshire 1645–48
 Sir John Burgoyne, 3rd Baronet (c. 1651–1709), High Sheriff of Bedfordshire, one of the Burgoyne baronets
 Sir John Burgoyne, 5th Baronet (c. 1705–1716), one of the Burgoyne baronets
 Sir John Burgoyne, 7th Baronet (1739–1785), general; cousin of Lieutenant-general John Burgoyne.
 Sir John Montagu Burgoyne, 9th Baronet (1796–1858), High Sheriff of Bedfordshire; colonel, of the Burgoyne baronets
 Sir John Montagu Burgoyne, 10th Baronet (1832–1921), of the Burgoyne baronets

See also
Burgoyne